Top Chef Canada is the Canadian spin-off of the American reality competition television series Top Chef which premiered on 11 April 2011, on Food Network Canada. The show features chefs competing against each other in various culinary challenges. They are judged by a panel of professional chefs and other notables from the food and wine industry with one or more contestants eliminated in each episode.

Series overview 

<onlyinclude>

Episodes

Season 1 (2011)

Season 2 (2012)

Season 3 (2013)

Season 4 (2014)

Season 5 (2017)

Season 6 (2018)

Season 7 (2019)

Season 8 (2020)

Season 9 (2021)

Season 10 (2022)

References

Lists of Canadian television series episodes